Shantha Mayadunne (4 April 1951 – 21 April 2019) was a Sri Lankan chef and television personality.

Career
She had thirty years of experience in the culinary arts and became one of the most popular Sri Lankan television chefs. She learned advanced international cooking techniques at cooking schools in many countries including Australia, UK, Singapore, Thailand and India. As her popularity grew, she started to conduct classes, through workshops and  mass media programs. She published two books, the first in 2001 and the second in 2005.

Death
She was killed together with her daughter on 21 April 2019 by a suicide bomber during a series of terrorist attacks in Sri Lanka, while they were both at the Shangri-La Hotel in Colombo for breakfast.

References

1951 births
2019 deaths
Sri Lankan chefs
Sri Lankan television chefs
Sri Lankan terrorism victims
Sri Lankan murder victims
Place of birth missing
Food writers
Women chefs
21st-century Sri Lankan women writers
21st-century Sri Lankan writers
People murdered in Sri Lanka
20th-century births
2019 Sri Lanka Easter bombings